Rolf Apweiler is a director of European Bioinformatics Institute (EBI) part of the European Molecular Biology Laboratory (EMBL) with Ewan Birney.

Education
Apweiler gained his PhD in biochemistry from Heidelberg University.

Research
Apweiler has been working on the Swiss-Prot protein sequence database since 1987, and in 1994 he became leader of the Swiss-Prot group. He has been joint head of the Protein and Nucleotide Data (PANDA) Group since 2007. The PANDA group is involved in several international collaborations like the Human Proteome Organization (HUPO) Proteomics Standards Initiative. Apweiler is a member of the Nomenclature Committee of IUBMB, the FlyBase advisory board, the committee of the Helmholtz Centre for Infection Research (HZI) and the advisory board of the Human Proteome Resource (HPR).

Apweiler is an editor of the FEBS Journal and a section editor of BMC Bioinformatics and has published more than 200 papers.

Awards and honours
Apweiler was elected a member of the European Molecular Biology Organization (EMBO) in 2012 and elected a Fellow of the International Society for Computational Biology in 2015.

References

|-

Living people
German bioinformaticians
Members of the European Molecular Biology Organization
Fellows of the International Society for Computational Biology
Year of birth missing (living people)